Armageddon: The End Times is a role-playing game published by Myrmidon Press in 1997, with a second edition by Eden Studios, Inc. in 2003.

Description
Armageddon: The End Times was a connected game to CJ Carella's WitchCraft that described a potential future for the same setting.

Publication history
Armageddon was published by Myrmidon Press in 1997, with a second edition by Eden Studios, Inc. in 2003.

Unisystem was developed by C.J. Carella for the first editions of his WitchCraft, and Armageddon role-playing games.

George Vasilakos and M. Alexander Jurkat were fans of C.J. Carella's work, and in July 1998 they announced an exclusive license to Carella's WitchCraft and Armageddon role-playing games, previously published by small-press roleplaying company Myrmidon Press. Armageddon 2nd Edition was later published using the Unisystem gaming system.

Eden Studios also released Enemies Archived (2006), a monster manual for Armageddon in PDF and POD produced in conjunction with Misfit Studios.

Reception

Reviews
Backstab #6
The Unspeakable Oath #16/17 (2001 Digest)

References

Eden Studios games
Post-apocalyptic role-playing games
Role-playing games introduced in 1997